Multnomah may refer to:

The Multnomah people, a Chinookan people who lived in the area of modern Portland, Oregon, United States
Multnomah, the middle Chinookan dialect of the Multnomah people

Places, vessels, and institutions whose name is derived from the name of the tribe
Multnomah (sternwheeler), a steamboat that ran on the Columbia River and Puget Sound
Multnomah, Portland, Oregon, a neighborhood of Portland, Oregon
Multnomah College
Multnomah County, Oregon
Multnomah Falls
Multnomah University
Waterbrook Multnomah, a division of Random House.